Anuradha Ghandy (28 March 1954 – 12 April 2008) was an Indian communist, writer, and revolutionary leader. She was a Central Committee member of the Communist Party of India (Maoist). She was one of the founding members of the Communist Party of India (Marxist–Leninist), in Maharashtra.

Among the policy papers drafted by the Marxist movement, Anuradha had contributed significantly to the ones on castes and 'Feminism and Marxism'. She made the guerillas realise the potential of worker cooperatives in areas like agricultural production, in Dandakaranya. She was also critical on shifting patriarchal ideas that were then dominant in the party.

In her obituary for Anuradha, with whom she was friends from the days when the latter was still a college student in the 1970s, Jyoti Punwani wrote: "'The Naxalite menace', says Manmohan Singh, 'is the biggest threat to the country'. But I remember a girl who was always laughing and who gave up a life rich in every way to change the lives of others".

Early life
Anuradha was born to an older generation of communists, Ganesh and Kumud Shanbag, who were married in the CPI office in Mumbai. They were in the party till the mid-1950s, when it had not yet branched into the present Maoist and Marxist factions. Ganesh later got into the Defence committee, and volunteered to work in the cases filed against the communists. Kumud has been an active social worker all her life, and is at present involved with a women's group. The couple were very progressive in the way they brought up their children, who later became revolutionaries. Anuradha's brother, Sunil Shanbag, is a progressive Mumbai-based playwright, writing left-wing revolutionary plays. Anuradha attended J. B. Petit School in Santacruz. The children were exposed to varied views and ideas and were motivated to read a lot and develop their own interests such as classical dancing and theatre. In such a household, where communist ideas enjoyed a monopoly, it was inevitable that Anuradha would become intrigued with revolutionary politics. The prime period for the communist propaganda in India was the 1970s, with the Cultural Revolution in China, opposition to the Vietnam War in the US, and many other social changes. It was during this time that Naxalbari came into being, starting tribal and workers revolts across whole of South Asia. Anuradha was then involved with PROYOM, a radical student group.

Political career
In the 1970s, Elphinstone College, Mumbai was a hub for the extremist left-wing activists, and Anuradha played a prime role. What she saw in the refugee camps in war-hit Bangladesh, and also the famine-hit areas of Maharashtra prior to that, must have brought her close to social work. Then she got into Progressive Youth Movement (PROYOM), from where she connected to the then-Naxalite movement. She took part in the 1975 Dalit Panther Movement.

She was one of the leading figures in India in its post-emergency days, when the Committee for Protection of Democratic Rights was founded. Her interests in the trade unions and the dalit movements of the Vidarbha region led to her move from Mumbai to Nagpur in 1982. She was arrested a number of times around this time, after which she went underground. There were mentions of her involvement with the tribals in Bastar. She was leading the women's wing of the party, working underground, until her death.

Personal life
In November 1983, Anuradha Shanbag married Kobad Ghandy, also a  Naxalite like herself. Ghandy hails from a Gujarati-Parsi family.

Death
Anuradha died of causes related to falciparum malaria on 12 April 2008. Due to her fear of government persecution including arrests or false encounters (she would be seen by the state as a ‘Maoist terrorist’) she had given the doctor she went to for a checkup a false name and dud phone number. When the doctor found that she had the parasite Plasmodium falciparum, he could not get through to her to warn her about these test results. On April 11, 2008, she was admitted to a hospital in Mumbai, but by then it was too late to save her. She died at the age of 54 on April 12, 2008. Systemic sclerosis had weakened her immune system, leading to multiple organ failure, which was, among other things, a contributing factor to her tragic death. It was during her stint in Jharkhand, educating the tribals against oppression of women in their society, when she contracted cerebral malaria. During her final days, she had been training the women cadre to develop leadership skills.

Bibliography

Articles
 2001: "Fascism, Fundamentalism, and Patriarchy"
2001: "People's War has shattered the hesitations of the women of Dandakaranya"

Books
2006: Philosophical Trends in the Feminist Movement
2012: Scripting the Change: Selected Writings of Anuradha Ghandy
2015: The Caste Question In India

References

Communist Party of India (Maoist) politicians
1954 births
2008 deaths
Naxalite–Maoist insurgency
Feminists
Anti-revisionists
Elphinstone College alumni